Kishiryu Sentai Ryusoulger is a Japanese tokusatsu television series, the last series in the franchise released in the Heisei period (filming and the first seven episodes aired are considered Heisei episodes), first series in the franchise released in Japan's Reiwa period (episode 8 is the first Reiwa episode), and the 43rd entry of Toei's long-running Super Sentai series produced by TV Asahi. The series follows the knights of the Ryusoul Tribe who fight the Druidon Tribe, a powerful race of monsters that once ruled Earth before fleeing to space 65 million years ago and have now returned to reclaim it.

Episodes

References

Ryusoulger
Kishiryu Sentai Ryusoulger